Azuma Dam is an earthfill dam located in Chiba Prefecture in Japan. The dam is used for water supply. The catchment area of the dam is 5.2 km2. The dam impounds about 9  ha of land when full and can store 450 thousand cubic meters of water. The construction of the dam was started on 1973 and completed in 1976.

References

Dams in Chiba Prefecture
1976 establishments in Japan